José Manuel "Conny" Varela Fernández (born February 13, 1954) is a Puerto Rican politician affiliated with the Popular Democratic Party (PPD). He has been a member of the Puerto Rico House of Representatives since 1997 representing District 32.

Early years and studies

Varela was born on February 13, 1954, in Cayey. He studied in Notre Dame College of Caguas and graduated from Miguel Meléndez Muñoz High School, where he received a medal for leadership. Varela completed a bachelor's degree in political science from the University of Puerto Rico, graduating magna cum laude in 1974. In 1977, he received a Juris Doctor from the University of Puerto Rico School of Law. During his first year studying there, he served as president of his class. During his last year, he worked at the Puerto Rico Department of Justice, specifically at the Office of the District Attorney.

Professional career

From 1977 to 1996, Varela was a partner in the Varela & Varela law firm. In 1978, he worked as professor of criminology at Puerto Rico Junior College. He was also a professor of commercial law in Caguas City College from 1979 to 1980. From 1989 to 1991, he served as legal advisor of the Government Commission of the Puerto Rico House of Representatives.

In 1982, he presided the Great Olympic Crusade, and received a special recognition from the Puerto Rico Olympic Committee for his work. In 1987, he was selected by the Puerto Rico Department of Sports and Recreation as Distinguished Youth of Caguas, in the category of law.

Political career

Varela began his political career in 1993, when he was elected as member of the Municipal Assembly of Caguas.

In 1996, Varela was elected for the first time to the House of Representatives for the District 32. During his first term, he was the minority speaker in the Commissions of Criminal Law, Municipal Affairs, and Retirement Systems. He was also a member of the Commissions of Government, Civil Law, and the Special Commission to Fight Crime.

Varela was reelected in the 2000 general election. During his second term, he presided the Commissions of Government, and served as vice-president of the Treasury Commission. He was again reelected in 2004, after which he served as member of the Commissions of Government, Budget, and Socioeconomic Development.

At the 2008 general elections, Varela was reelected for his fourth consecutive term, and served as minority speaker in the Commissions of Socioeconomic Development, as well as member of the Commissions of Government, Integral Development of the East Region, Public Safety, Housing, and Federal Affairs.

In 2010, with the death of longtime mayor of Caguas, William Miranda Marín, Varela unexpectedly presented his candidacy to the seat, challenging Miranda's son, William Miranda Torres. After an impromptu election within the Delegates Assembly, Varela received the majority of votes (35-30) to become mayor. Upon his exit from the Assembly, Varela was attacked by a crowd of people who threw bottles at him. However, due to irregularities in the process, he wasn't certified and the party ended up annulling the voting. Miranda Torres was elected shortly afterwards.

Varela was reelected for his fifth term as representative in 2012.

Personal life

Although he was born in Cayey, Varela has lived in Caguas since 1976. He is married and has three children.

References

External links
José "Conny" Varela on CamaraDeRepresentantes.org
José "Conny" Varela Profile on WAPA-TV

|-

1954 births
Living people
People from Cayey, Puerto Rico
Popular Democratic Party members of the House of Representatives of Puerto Rico
University of Puerto Rico alumni